This following is a comprehensive listing of official releases by Hey Monday, a four-piece American pop punk band, formed in 2008 in West Palm Beach, Florida. They released their debut album Hold On Tight in 2008 which produced notable singles "Homecoming" and "How You Love Me Now". The album was followed up with their 2010 EP Beneath It All, which achieved moderate commercial success and Candles EP in 2011. The Christmas EP was self-released and came on December 6 later that year. However, the band is no longer together.

Studio albums

Extended plays

Singles

Other charted songs
"Hangover", "Wish You Were Here" and "In My Head".

Music videos

Other appearances

References

Punk rock group discographies
Discographies of American artists